Kevin Fahey is an Irish Gaelic footballer who plays as a centre-back for the Tipperary senior team. At club level Fahey plays with Clonmel Commercials.

On 22 November 2020, Fahey started at centre-back as Tipperary won the 2020 Munster Senior Football Championship after a 0-17 to 0-14 win against Cork in the final. It was Tipperary's first Munster title in 85 years.

In January 2021, Fahey was nominated for an All-Star award.

Honours

Player

Clonmel Commercials
Tipperary Senior Football Championship (5): 2012, 2015, 2017, 2019, 2020
Munster Senior Club Football Championship (1): 2015

Tipperary
Munster Senior Football Championship (1): 2020

References

Living people
Clonmel Commercials Gaelic footballers
Tipperary inter-county Gaelic footballers
Year of birth missing (living people)